IVI Ryo Corporation is a company in the Philippines the sells Beauty Products and Dietary Supplements. All products are formulated, sourced, and manufactured in Japan approved by FDA in the Philippines.

Flagship brands
IVI
MET Tathione

Pharmaceutical companies of the Philippines
Philippine companies established in 2010
Companies based in Quezon City
Health care companies established in 2010